Kiseleozyorka is a rural locality (a selo) in Nikolsky Selsoviet of Belogorsky District, Amur Oblast, Russia. The population was 217 as of 2018. There are 3 streets.

Geography 
Kiseleozyorka is located on the left bank of the Tom River, 28 km west of Belogorsk (the district's administrative centre) by road. Klyuchi is the nearest rural locality.

References 

Rural localities in Belogorsky District